Gas check is a device related to the ammunition of guns of various sizes, from small arms to heavy guns. In some cases the term is hyphenated.

Gas check may refer to:
 Gas check, used with small arms ammunition
 Gas-checks in British RML heavy guns, used with heavy artillery ammunition